The 60th New York State Legislature, consisting of the New York State Senate and the New York State Assembly, met from January 3 to May 16, 1837, during the fifth year of William L. Marcy's governorship, in Albany.

Background
Under the provisions of the New York Constitution of 1821, 32 senators were elected on general tickets in eight senatorial districts for four-year terms. They were divided into four classes, and every year eight Senate seats came up for election. Assemblymen were elected countywide on general tickets to a one-year term, the whole Assembly being renewed annually.

State Senator John C. Kemble resigned on May 20, 1836; and State Senator Isaac W. Bishop on May 23; leaving vacancies in the Third and Fourth District.

On May 23, 1836, the Legislature re-apportioned the Senate and Assembly districts, according to the State census of 1835. Queens and Suffolk counties were transferred from the First to the Second District; Delaware County from the Second to the Third; Herkimer County from the Fifth to the Fourth; Otsego from the Sixth to the Fifth; Allegany, Cattaraugus and Livingston counties from the Eighth to the Sixth; and Cortland County from the Sixth to the Seventh. The total number of assemblymen remained 128. The new county of Chemung was apportioned one seat. Allegany, Cattaraugus, Chautauqua, Erie, Genesee, Kings, Niagara, Oswego and Steuben counties gained one seat each; New York County gained two; and Cayuga, Dutchess, Herkimer, Oneida, Otsego, Rensselaer, Saratoga, Seneca, Tioga, Tompkins, Washington and Westchester counties lost one seat each.

At this time there were two major political parties: the Democratic Party and the Whig Party. In New York City, a radical faction of the Democratic Party organized as the Equal Rights Party, and became known as the Locofocos.

The Democratic state convention met on September 14 at Herkimer and nominated Gov. William L. Marcy and Lt. Gov. John Tracy for re-election; and an electoral ticket pledged to Martin Van Buren for president and Richard M. Johnson for vice president.

The Whig state convention nominated Jesse Buel for Governor, and Gamaliel H. Barstow for Lieutenant Governor; and an electoral ticket pledged to William Henry Harrison for president.

The Equal Rights state convention met on September 15 at Utica, and nominated Isaac S. Smith for Governor; and Moses Jaques for Lieutenant Governor. In New York City, they  nominated Frederick A. Tallmadge for the State Senate; and a full ticket for the Assembly, among them  Clinton Roosevelt and Robert Townsend Jr. Tallmadge, Roosevelt and Townsend were then endorsed by the Whigs, and elected.

Elections
The State election was held from November 7 to 9, 1836. Gov. William L. Marcy and Lt. Gov. John Tracy were re-elected to a third term. Also, the Democratic electoral ticket won; the 42 New York votes were cast for Martin Van Buren and Richard M. Johnson. In New York City, the combined vote of the Whigs and Locofocos upset the Tammany Hall political machine, electing the State Senator of the First District, and 7 of 13 assemblymen.

State Senators Samuel Young (4th D.), David Wager (5th D.) and Samuel L. Edwards (7th D.) were re-elected.

Sessions
The Legislature met for the regular session at the Old State Capitol in Albany on January 3, 1837; and adjourned on May 16.

Edward Livingston (D) was elected Speaker with 80 votes against 27 for Luther Bradish (W).

Upon taking their seats in the Senate, Johnson and Paige (3rd D.), and McLean and Young (4th D.), drew lots to decide which one of the two senators elected in each district would serve the short term, and which one the full term. Paige and McLean drew the short term, and Johnson and Young the full term.

On February 6, State Treasurer Abraham Keyser was re-elected.

On February 7, the Legislature re-elected U.S. Senator Silas Wright, Jr. to a six-year term beginning on March 4, 1837.

Near the end of the session, the Panic of 1837 erupted.

State Senate

Districts
 The First District (4 seats) consisted of Kings, New York and Richmond counties.
 The Second District (4 seats) consisted of Dutchess, Orange, Putnam, Queens, Rockland, Suffolk, Sullivan, Ulster and Westchester counties.
 The Third District (4 seats) consisted of Albany, Columbia, Delaware, Greene, Rensselaer, Schenectady and Schoharie counties.
 The Fourth District (4 seats) consisted of Clinton, Essex, Franklin, Hamilton, Herkimer, Montgomery, St. Lawrence, Saratoga, Warren and Washington counties.
 The Fifth District (4 seats) consisted of Jefferson, Lewis, Madison, Oneida, Oswego and Otsego counties.
 The Sixth District (4 seats) consisted of Allegany, Broome, Cattaraugus, Chemung, Chenango, Livingston, Steuben, Tioga and Tompkins counties.
 The Seventh District (4 seats) consisted of Cayuga, Cortland, Onondaga, Ontario, Seneca, Wayne and Yates counties.
 The Eighth District (4 seats) consisted of Chautauqua, Erie, Genesee, Monroe, Niagara and Orleans counties.

Note: There are now 62 counties in the State of New York. The counties which are not mentioned in this list had not yet been established, or sufficiently organized, the area being included in one or more of the abovementioned counties.

Members
The asterisk (*) denotes members of the previous Legislature who continued in office as members of this Legislature.

Senators who resided in counties which were transferred to a different district continued to represent the district in which they were elected.

Employees
 Clerk: John F. Bacon

State Assembly

Districts

 Albany County (3 seats)
 Allegany County (2 seats)
 Broome County (1 seat)
 Cattaraugus County (2 seats)
 Cayuga County (3 seats)
 Chautauqua County (3 seats)
 Chemung County (1 seat)
 Chenango County (3 seats)
 Clinton County (1 seat)
 Columbia County (3 seats)
 Cortland County (2 seats)
 Delaware County (2 seats)
 Dutchess County (3 seats)
 Erie County (3 seats)
 Essex County (1 seat)
 Franklin County (1 seat)
 Genesee County (4 seats)
 Greene County (2 seats)
 Hamilton and Montgomery counties (3 seats)
 Herkimer County (2 seats)
 Jefferson County (3 seats)
 Kings County (2 seats)
 Lewis County (1 seat)
 Livingston County (2 seats)
 Madison County (3 seats)
 Monroe County (3 seats)
 The City and County of New York (13 seats)
 Niagara County (2 seats)
 Oneida County (4 seats)
 Onondaga County (4 seats)
 Ontario County (3 seats)
 Orange County (3 seats)
 Orleans County (1 seat)
 Oswego County (2 seats)
 Otsego County (3 seats)
 Putnam County (1 seat)
 Queens County (1 seat)
 Rensselaer County (3 seats)
 Richmond County (1 seat)
 Rockland County (1 seat)
 St. Lawrence County (2 seats)
 Saratoga County (2 seats)
 Schenectady County (1 seat)
 Schoharie County (2 seats)
 Seneca County (1 seat)
 Steuben County (3 seats)
 Suffolk County (2 seats)
 Sullivan County (1 seat)
 Tioga County (1 seat)
 Tompkins County (2 seats)
 Ulster County (2 seats)
 Warren County (1 seat)
 Washington (2 seats)
 Wayne County (2 seats)
 Westchester County (2 seats)
 Yates County (1 seat)

Note: There are now 62 counties in the State of New York. The counties which are not mentioned in this list had not yet been established, or sufficiently organized, the area being included in one or more of the abovementioned counties.

Assemblymen
The asterisk (*) denotes members of the previous Legislature who continued as members of this Legislature.

Party affiliations follow the vote on State officers on February 6 and 7;, the result given by the Whig Almanac, and the result for New York City given in Niles' Register.

Employees
 Clerk: Philip Reynolds Jr.
 Sergeant-at-Arms: Alden S. Stevens
 Doorkeeper: William H. Powell
 Assistant Doorkeeper: James Halliday Jr.

Notes

Sources
 The New York Civil List compiled by Franklin Benjamin Hough (Weed, Parsons and Co., 1858) [pg. 109 and 441 for Senate districts; pg. 131 for senators; pg. 148f for Assembly districts; pg. 219f for assemblymen]
 The History of Political Parties in the State of New-York, from the Ratification of the Federal Constitution to 1840 by Jabez D. Hammond (4th ed., Vol. 2, Phinney & Co., Buffalo, 1850; pg. 462 to 479)

060
1837 in New York (state)
1837 U.S. legislative sessions